The Dockyard Ports Regulation Act 1865 (28 & 29 Vict, c. 125; An Act for the Regulation of Dockyard Ports) was a UK act of parliament, which gained royal assent on 6 July 1865. It applied to "any port, harbour, haven, roadstead, sound, channel, creek, bay, or navigable river of the United Kingdom in, on, or near to which Her Majesty now or at any time hereafter has any dock, dockyard, steam factory yard, victualling yard, arsenal, wharf, or mooring" (Section 1), though it also reserved the monarch the right to define by Orders in Council the limits of a dockyard port for the Act's purposes (Section 3).

It inaugurated the post of a Queen's Harbour Master for each "Dockyard Port", to be appointed by the Admiralty to oversee the Act's execution and to protect that port in general (Section 4), with powers to unmoor and search vessels and to remove wrecks (Sections 11–16), as well as setting out his involvement in legal actions (Section 24). It also gave justices of the peace jurisdiction over vessels passing by the shore of their jurisdiction (Section 22).

It made it lawful for the monarch in council via Orders in Council to regulate and impose penalties for matters within such "Dockyard Ports", such as mooring for naval ships, loading and unloading gunpowder, using combustible materials like tar, imposing a speed limit on steam vessels in certain areas, having one person aboard every ship at all times and carrying lights and signals (Sections 5–7). Any such Orders in Council were to be put before Parliament within 30 days of being agreed (Section 26; repealed by the Statute Law (Repeals) Act 1986) and made available publicly by the Admiralty (Sections 8–9). It also set out the operation of the penalties imposed by such Orders in Council (Sections 17–21).

References

United Kingdom Acts of Parliament 1865
1865 in British law